Istana Melawati is the second national palace of Malaysia's Yang di-Pertuan Agong in Putrajaya after the Istana Negara in Kuala Lumpur. It serves as a royal retreat for the Yang di-Pertuan Agong.

History 
The Melawati Palace is located in Precinct 1, Putrajaya. Construction of the palace began in 1999 and was completed in 2002. It has a resort concept and serves as a retreat for the Yang di-Pertuan Agong. The name of the palace was given by the Yang di-Pertuan Agong Sultan Salahuddin Abdul Aziz Shah of Selangor.  Melawati literally means guard's tower.

Architecture 
Designed by Raja Kamarul Bahrin, principal of Senibahri Arkitek architectural practice, the palace comprises four main components namely:
 Royal Wing - Private quarters
 Reception Wing - Ceremonial Reception Hall
 Banquet Wing - Functions
 Administrative Block - Offices

Three tall towers form a prominent structure at the side and centre of the palace. These towers represent old guard towers to be found in medieval Malay palaces. The three tiered roofs with intricate eaves details and clay 'buah butong' (appendages at the corners) provides an authentic attempt to replicate Malay traditional roof designs of the east coast. Inside the palace at the main staircase of the Meeting Wing, is a Melawati which is made from chengal wood topped with golden roof.

Interior 
The Royal Wing consists the following components: 

 Royal Bedroom 
 Royal Resting Room 
 Royal Banquet Room 
 Office of the Seri Paduka Baginda Yang di-Pertuan Agong 
 Office of the Seri Paduka Baginda Raja Permaisuri Agong 
 Royal Bath (Royal Swimming Pool) 
 Royal Kitchen 
 Royal Guest House 
 Royal Gallery 
 Main Meeting Room 
 Balai Rong Seri (Throne Room)

External links

 Information about the Istana Melawati

Melawati
Melawati
Royal residences in Malaysia
2002 establishments in Malaysia